The 2012 Dubai Sevens was held between 30 November 2012 and 1 December 2012 at The Sevens Stadium in Dubai. It was the 24th edition of the tournament and the second stop of the 2012–13 IRB Sevens World Series.

Samoa defeated New Zealand 26–15 in the final to win the title.

Format
The teams were drawn into four pools of four teams each. Each team played everyone in their pool one time. The top two teams from each pool advanced to the Cup/Plate brackets. The bottom two teams from each group went to the Bowl/Shield brackets.

Pool Stage

Pool A

Pool B

Pool C

Pool D

Knockout stage

Shield (13th place)

Bowl (9th place)

Plate (5th place)

Cup (1st place)

References

External links

2012
2012–13 IRB Sevens World Series
2012 in Emirati sport
2012 in Asian rugby union
November 2012 sports events in Asia
December 2012 sports events in Asia